Lea is the second album by Lea Salonga, presenting a danceable R&B sound. The album received favourable reviews for its diverse mix of American-style R&B and easy listening ballads, and became her first multi-platinum album.

Track listing
"Anything for You"
"I Still Believe" (duet with Charlie Masso of Menudo)
"I Wanna Little Love"
"If I Give My Heart to You"
"Mula Noon, Hanggang Ngayon"
"Only You"
"Please Naman"
"That Situation" (duet with Menudo)

References

1988 albums
Lea Salonga albums